Felipe Ferreira de Moraes Honório (born September 22, 1988) is a Brazilian footballer.

References

External links

1988 births
Living people
Association football midfielders
Brazilian expatriate footballers
Brazilian expatriate sportspeople in Thailand
Felipe Ferreira
Felipe Ferreira
Felipe Ferreira
Felipe Ferreira
Brazilian footballers
Expatriate footballers in Thailand
Felipe Ferreira